Malice in Wonderland is the eleventh studio album by the Scottish hard rock band Nazareth, released in January 1980. After the heavy lurch of the previous album, the band chose to follow a more commercial path and the album produced the hit singles "Holiday" and "Heart's Grown Cold". This is the second and last studio album to feature guitarist Zal Cleminson of the Sensational Alex Harvey Band as a member of the band.

The album was re-issued on Compact Disc in February 1991. The larger 2010 edition brought a range of bonus tracks, all extracted from a concert at the legendary Hammersmith Odeon, which were broadcast by the BBC for the In Concert program in 1980. It is a very varied album, with melodic and heavy songs like "Talkin' to One of the Boys" and "Showdown at the Border" and the flirtation with a reggae feeling in "Big Boy".

Track listing

1998 bonus tracks 

 This remastered CD, released on Castle Records subsidiary Essential Records (ESMCD 617) in 1998, added four bonus tracks and extensive liner notes:
 These live tracks were recorded at London's Hammersmith Odeon and had been originally released as a 2 x 7 inch vinyl EP in a gatefold sleeve.
 An identical release was later issued on another Castle Records subsidiary, Sanctuary Records.

30th anniversary bonus tracks 

 The Hammersmith live songs from the 1998 remaster are not all on the 30th Anniversary Remaster, the compilers choosing to keep only the two songs relevant to the track list for Malice In Wonderland and omitting Razamanaz and Hair of the Dog.

2010 remastered bonus tracks 

 This remastered CD was released by Salvo records (SALVOCD043), August 2010.
 These BBC live recordings were recorded at Hammersmith Odeon, March 16, 1980.
 The live recording of "Beggar's Day" has not been available before this release.

Personnel

Band members 
 Dan McCafferty – vocals
 Manny Charlton – guitars
 Zal Cleminson – guitars, synthesiser
 Pete Agnew – bass guitar, backing vocals
 Darrell Sweet – drums

Other credits 
 Jeff Baxter – producer tracks 1–10, guitar, synthesizer
 Greg Mathieson – string arrangements on "Fallen Angel"
 Paulinho Da Costa – percussion on "Turning a New Leaf" and "Talkin' 'Bout Love"
 Alan Estes – vibes on "Fast Cars"
 Venetta Fields, Sherlie Matthews, Paulette Brown – back vocals on "Heart's Grown Cold"
 Terri & The Semiconductors – back vocals on "Big Boy"
 Nazareth – producer tracks 11–14.
 Recorded at Compass Point Studios in Nassau, Bahamas.
 Amy Nagasawa – album design

Chart performance

Certifications

References 

Nazareth (band) albums
1980 albums
A&M Records albums